Charlotte Gibson is an American television soap opera writer. Gibson was hired as a Breakdown Writer on Days of Our Lives by Hogan Sheffer. She attended New York University's Graduate Acting Program at the Tisch School of the Arts, graduating in 1990.

Positions held
All My Children 
 Script Writer (1997-2001)

As the World Turns
Breakdown Writer, Headwriting Team (2002-2005)

Days of Our Lives
Breakdown Writer (2006-2008)

General Hospital
Script Writer (June 30, 2016 – present)

Guiding Light (Hired by David Kreizman)
Breakdown Writer, Headwriting Team (October 2005 - August, 2006)

Awards and nominations
Daytime Emmy Award
Win, 2007, Best Writing, Guiding Light
Nomination, 2003-2006, Best Writing, As the World Turns
Wins, 2004 & 2005, Best Writing, As the World Turns
Nomination, 1998, 1999, 2001 & 2002, Best Writing, All My Children
Win, 1998, Best Writing, All My Children

Writers Guild of America Award
Win, 2006, Best Writing, As the World Turns
Nomination, 2006, Best Writing, Guiding Light
Nomination, 2005, Best Writing, As the World Turns
Win, 2001, Best Writing, All My Children
Win, 2000, Best Writing, All My Children
Nomination, 1999, Best Writing, All My Children
Win, 1998, Best Writing, All My Children
Nomination, 1997, Best Writing, All My Children

External links

References

American soap opera writers
Writers Guild of America Award winners
Living people
Tisch School of the Arts alumni
Year of birth missing (living people)